Nancy E. Dick (born July 22, 1930) was the 41st Lieutenant Governor of Colorado. She was a Democrat and served from 1979 to 1987 under Governor Richard Lamm. She was Colorado's first female lieutenant governor.

She was born in Detroit, Michigan and attended the University of Denver College of Law. She served two terms in the Colorado House of Representatives before being elected Lieutenant Governor. She was the Democratic nominee for the U.S. Senate in 1984, losing to incumbent Republican William L. Armstrong.

Dick's grandsons are Tomicah Tillemann and Levi Tillemann.

See also
List of female lieutenant governors in the United States

References

|-

1930 births
21st-century American women
Lieutenant Governors of Colorado
Living people
People from Aspen, Colorado
Politicians from Detroit
University of Denver alumni
Women in Colorado politics